Patryk Sokołowski (born 25 September 1994) is a Polish footballer who plays as a midfielder for Legia Warsaw. Besides Legia, he has played for Olimpia Elbląg, Znicz Pruszków, Wigry Suwałki and Piast Gliwice, and with the latter club he won the Polish championship in 2019.

Honours

Club

Piast Gliwice
Ekstraklasa: 2018–19

References

Polish footballers
1994 births
Living people
Legia Warsaw II players
Olimpia Elbląg players
Znicz Pruszków players
Wigry Suwałki players
Piast Gliwice players
Legia Warsaw players
Association football midfielders
Ekstraklasa players
I liga players
II liga players
III liga players
Footballers from Warsaw